David McAughtrie (born 30 January 1963) is a Scottish former footballer who played in the Football League for Carlisle United, Darlington, Stoke City and York City.

Career
Born in Ayr, McAughtrie played for the local boys club and earned youth caps for Scotland. In 1980, he left to join English First Division side Stoke City. He made a terrible start to his Stoke career as Stoke lost 5–0 away at Nottingham Forest on his debut and he spent the rest of the 1980–81 seasons in the reserves. He recovered from his poor start and became a fringe player at the Victoria Ground under Alan Durban and Richie Barker making 59 appearances scoring three goals. He joined Carlisle United for the 1984–85 season and later played for York City and Darlington.

He then played for Northwich Victoria and was later with Bishop Auckland, Harrogate Town, Goole Town and briefly for Mossley early in the 1994-95 season.

Career statistics
Source:

A.  The "Other" column constitutes appearances and goals in the Football League play-offs and Football League Trophy.

References

External links
 David McAughtrie York City profile

Scottish footballers
Stoke City F.C. players
Carlisle United F.C. players
York City F.C. players
Darlington F.C. players
English Football League players
1963 births
Living people
Association football defenders
Mossley A.F.C. players
Bishop Auckland F.C. players
Northwich Victoria F.C. players
Harrogate Town A.F.C. players
Goole A.F.C. players